The Petit Vignemale is a summit in the French Pyrenees in the massif du Vignemale. Access is possible either by the Gaube valley (beyond Cauterêts), or la vallée d'Ossoue.

Toponymy 
Vignemale is a tautological compound of two pre-Indo-European vin and mal both meaning « mountain ».

Geography 
Le Petit Vignemale is located in the Hautes-Pyrénées department, near Cauterets and Gavarnie arrondissement of Argelès-Gazost in the Pyrenees National Park.

Geology 
The summit is composed of sediment masses from the early Devonian period.

Climbing  
The first ascent was made in August 1798 by La Baumelle.

Access
Two routes :
 normal route (hiking) ;
 north harbor (climbing).

References 

Mountains of the Pyrenees
Mountains of Hautes-Pyrénées
Pyrenean three-thousanders